Elbe-Ehle-Nuthe was a Verwaltungsgemeinschaft ("collective municipality") in the Anhalt-Bitterfeld district, in Saxony-Anhalt, Germany. It was situated on the right bank of the Elbe, around Zerbst, which was the seat of the Verwaltungsgemeinschaft, but not part of it. It was named after the three rivers Elbe, Ehle, and Nuthe, which flow through its territory. It was disbanded on 1 January 2010.

The Verwaltungsgemeinschaft Elbe-Ehle-Nuthe consisted of the following municipalities:

References

Former Verwaltungsgemeinschaften in Saxony-Anhalt